ImageSource is a software and systems integration firm specializing in Enterprise Content Management. After years of providing integration services, ImageSource developed their own line of enterprise content management (ECM) tools based on principles of speed, ease of use, and flexibility. Their main areas of focus include data capture, workflow, content management, and eForms.

ImageSource launched its own ECM software suite ILINX® in 2010. ImageSource, Inc. is headquartered in Olympia, Washington, with offices in Irvine, California, and Monument, Colorado.

History
 1995: ImageSource is founded by Terry Sutherland and Victor Zvirzdys as a capture/scanner sales/computer services company.
 1995: ImageSource becomes incorporated.
 2007: ImageSource trademarks the Nexus brand.
 2012: ImageSource develops and brands ECMECOSYSTEM, an in-depth consultation methodology.

Technology partners
ImageSource has long-term technology partners with specialized software in capture, document imaging, workflow, web content management, records management, and other ECM functionality.

Hardware Partners
 Kodak

ILINX Products
ImageSource develops their own line of enterprise content management software applications called ILINX. Their clients range from city and state governments to Superior Courts, Universities, Financial Institutions, and Hospitals.

Awards

 2007 Inc. 5000 List Award
 2009 Carl E Nelson Best Practices Award showcasing successful ECM implementations
 2010 Puget Sound Business Journal Award for Washington Best Workplaces
 2014 Puget Sound Business Journal Award for Washington Best Workplaces

References

External links
 ImageSource, Inc. Official Website
 Browse ImageSource, Inc. Case Studies

Companies based in Olympia, Washington
Software companies of the United States